Shikhandi Kotha is a Bangladeshi drama film directed by Mohammad Hannan and written by Anan Zaman. The film was produced by Impress Telefilm Limited and released on April 19, 2013, and is based on the life of the third gender.

Plot
Ramela gives birth to a son after having two daughters and Ramzed Molla and Ramela are happy as a result. Ramzed named him Ratan. But Ratan's physical changes later appear as a girl. His family and people of the village realizes this change. But, Ramela denies to send to the place of third gender. He became an obstacle to his sister's marriage and his father scolds him. He then realizes that society will not accept him and goes to the third gender's place. There he grows under the supervision of Kali Masi as Ratna.

Cast
 Rakhal Sobuj - Ratan/Ratna
 Jayanta Chattopadhyay - Ramzed Molla
 Rokeya Prachy
 Mirana Zaman

Awards
Meril Prothom Alo Awards
 Critics Choice Awards for Best Director - Mohammad Hannan
 Critics Choice Awards for Best Film Actor - Rakhal Sobuj

References

External links
 Shikhandi Kotha on BMDb

2013 films
Bengali-language Bangladeshi films
LGBT-related drama films
2013 LGBT-related films
2010s Bengali-language films
2013 drama films
Bangladeshi drama films
Impress Telefilm films